Mangeli-ye Olya (also Romanized as Mangelī-ye ‘Olyā; also known as Esmā‘īlābād-e Mangalī, Abād Mangelī, Esmā‘īlābād-e Mangalī-ye Bālā, Esmātl Ābād-e Mang Alī, Mangalī-ye Bālā, Mangelī, and Mangili) is a village in Safiabad Rural District, Bam and Safiabad District, Esfarayen County, North Khorasan Province, Iran. At the 2006 census, its population was 227, in 54 families.

References 

Populated places in Esfarayen County